Paris is a 1926 American silent romantic drama film written and directed by Edmund Goulding. The film stars Charles Ray, Douglas Gilmore, and Joan Crawford.

Plot
A young American millionaire named Jerry is vacationing in Paris and visits an Apache den, the Birdcage Cafe, where he meets "The Girl". Trouble ensues when "The Cat" injures Jerry in a jealous rage. "The Girl" nurses Jerry back to health while "The Cat" plots to murder "The Girl".

Cast

References

External links

 
 
 

1926 films
1926 romantic drama films
American romantic drama films
American silent feature films
American black-and-white films
Films directed by Edmund Goulding
Films set in Paris
Metro-Goldwyn-Mayer films
1920s American films
Silent romantic drama films
Silent American drama films